Viliamu Lesiva (born 15 May 1965) is a Samoan boxer. He competed in the men's middleweight event at the 1988 Summer Olympics.

References

External links
 

1965 births
Living people
Samoan male boxers
Olympic boxers of Samoa
Boxers at the 1988 Summer Olympics
Place of birth missing (living people)
Middleweight boxers